The United States Department of Defense acknowledges holding 3 Iranian captives in Guantanamo.

A total of 779 captives have been held in extrajudicial detention in the Guantanamo Bay detention camps, in Cuba since the camps opened on January 11, 2002. The camp population peaked in 2004 at approximately 660. Only nineteen new captives, all "high value detainees" have been transferred there since the United States Supreme Court's ruling in Rasul v. Bush. As of July 2012, the camp population stands at approximately 168.

Iranian captives acknowledged by the DoD

References

Detainees of the Guantanamo Bay detention camp
Lists of Guantanamo Bay detainees by nationality
Guantanamo Bay
Iran–United States relations